Diego Domínguez may refer to:

 Diego Domínguez (rugby union) (born 1966), Argentine rugby union player for Argentina and Italy
 Diego Domínguez (rally driver) (born 1972), rally driver from Paraguay
 Diego Domínguez (actor) (born 1991), Spanish actor and singer